Julius Caesar Capaccio (1552–1631) was a learned Italian humanist of the 17th century. A civic humanist, in 1602 he was appointed secretary of the city of Naples.

Biography 
Giulio Cesare Capaccio was born in Campagna d'Eboli (Salerno) in 1552, of a humble family. As a youngster he became proficient in Latin and Greek before attending the University of Bologna, where he graduated in law. In 1592 appeared his treatise on emblems Delle imprese, a late but important testimony of Renaissance Neoplatonist tradition.  By the early 1600s he was deeply involved in local antiquarian studies, especially in the Phlegraean Fields. An erudite member of the humanist literary-historian circle in late sixteenth- and early seventeenth-century Naples, he was one of the most methodical local scholars interested in reconstructing Naples's past from antiquity to his day. In 1611 Capaccio became a founding member of the Neapolitan Accademia degli Oziosi (Academy of the Idle). He died in 1634, shortly after the publication of Il Forastiero, a guide to Naples in dialogue form, which is considered his masterpiece.

Il Forastiero is a huge narrative description of the history of Naples modeled after the conversation between a foreigner and a local sage, imagined as taking place over the course of ten days. His work was part of the historical and geographic genre that became popular in the later sixteenth century. It was, in fact, just the type of book he had helped establish with his earlier guides on the antiquities and natural marvels of the Phlegraean Fields. It was also akin to Eugenio Caracciolo's Napoli Sacra (1624) in its historical treatment of Naples's sacred sites, martyrs, and saints' cults. Capaccio's detailed descriptions and historical narrative embraced both the pagan and the early Christian period, from which the city's present political institutions and religious traditions were thought to have originated.

Works

References

Bibliography 
 This article incorporates text from Watkins Biographical Dictionary, a publication now in the public domain.

External links
 

1552 births
1631 deaths
Italian male non-fiction writers
17th-century Italian historians
17th-century Italian male writers
People from Campagna
Italian archaeologists
University of Naples Federico II alumni
University of Bologna alumni
Italian Renaissance humanists
17th-century Latin-language writers
Italian Renaissance writers
People of the Kingdom of Naples